

England
Head coach: Clive Woodward

 Garath Archer
 Neil Back
 Nick Beal
 Kyran Bracken
 Mike Catt
 Richard Cockerill
 Martin Corry
 Lawrence Dallaglio (c)
 Matt Dawson
 Darren Garforth
 Paul Grayson
 Danny Grewcock
 Jeremy Guscott
 Steve Hanley
 Austin Healey
 Richard Hill
 Martin Johnson
 Jason Leonard
 Dan Luger
 Barrie-Jon Mather
 Neil McCarthy
 Matt Perry
 David Rees
 Tim Rodber
 Graham Rowntree
 Victor Ubogu
 Tony Underwood
 Jonny Wilkinson

France
Head coach: Jean-Claude Skrela

 David Aucagne
 David Auradou
 Philippe Benetton
 Philippe Bernat-Salles
 Olivier Brouzet
 Christian Califano
 Philippe Carbonneau
 Thomas Castaignède
 Richard Castel
 Thierry Cleda
 Franck Comba
 Marc Dal Maso
 Marc de Rougemont
 Christophe Dominici
 Richard Dourthe
 Xavier Garbajosa
 Pascal Giordani
 Arthur Gomes
 Raphaël Ibañez (c)
 Christophe Juillet
 Christian Labit
 Christophe Laussucq
 Thomas Lièvremont
 Thomas Lombard
 Olivier Magne
 Sylvain Marconnet
 Émile Ntamack
 Fabien Pelous
 Marc Raynaud
 Franck Tournaire

Ireland
Head coach: Warren Gatland

 Jonny Bell
 Justin Bishop
 Trevor Brennan
 Peter Clohessy
 Victor Costello
 Jeremy Davidson
 Girvan Dempsey
 Eric Elwood
 Justin Fitzpatrick
 Mick Galwey
 Rob Henderson
 David Humphreys
 Paddy Johns
 Killian Keane
 Kevin Maggs
 Conor McGuinness
 Eric Miller
 Ross Nesdale
 Dion O'Cuinneagain
 Conor O'Shea
 Ciaran Scally
 Paul Wallace
 Andy Ward
 Keith Wood (c)
 Niall Woods

Scotland
Head coach: Jim Telfer

 Gary Armstrong (c)
 Steve Brotherstone
 Gordon Bulloch
 Paul Burnell
 Craig Chalmers
 Iain Fairley
 George Graham
 Stuart Grimes
 David Hilton
 Duncan Hodge
 John Leslie
 Martin Leslie
 Kenny Logan
 Shaun Longstaff
 Glenn Metcalfe
 Cameron Murray
 Scott Murray
 Eric Peters
 Budge Pountney
 Andy Reed
 Stuart Reid
 Tom Smith
 Alan Tait
 Gregor Townsend
 Peter Walton
 Doddie Weir

Wales
Head coach: Graham Henry

 Chris Anthony
 Allan Bateman
 Neil Boobyer
 Colin Charvis
 Leigh Davies
 Ben Evans
 Scott Gibbs
 Ian Gough
 Shane Howarth
 Rob Howley
 Jonathan Humphreys (c)
 Dafydd James
 Garin Jenkins
 Neil Jenkins
 Andrew Lewis
 Geraint Lewis
 David Llewellyn
 Kevin Morgan
 Darren Morris
 Craig Quinnell
 Scott Quinnell
 Matthew Robinson
 Peter Rogers
 Brett Sinkinson
 Mark Taylor
 Gareth Thomas
 Mike Voyle
 Nick Walne
 Barry Williams
 Martyn Williams
 Chris Wyatt
 David Young

External links

Six Nations Championship squads
Five Nations Championship Squads